José Peirats Valls (1908–1989) was a Spanish anarchist, activist, journalist and historian.

Biography 
Peirats was born on March 15, 1908, in La Vall d'Uixo, Province of Castellón. He was the second child of Jose Peirats Dupla and Teresa Valls Rubert, who were day laborers, working as espadrille makers (espardenyers).

Peirats came to anarchism after moving in his early years to Barcelona. He was a long-standing member of the Confederación Nacional del Trabajo (CNT) and at one point edited its newspaper, Solidaridad Obrera ('Workers Solidarity'). 

Peirats was a member of anarchist groups Afinidad (1932) and Verdad (1932-1936). He was also a member of the federation of anarchist affinity groups, the Federación Anarquista Ibérica (FAI). An account cited him as part of a delegation sent to Paris in November 1936 to purchase weapons.

In 1989, Peirats died in Barcelona.

Works
Anarchists in the Spanish Revolution. London: Freedom Press, 1990. .
The CNT in the Spanish Revolution. ChristieBooks, Hastings, 2005:  (vol. 1);  (vol. 2); [2006]:  (vol.3).

Further reading

References

External links
José Peirats in the Daily Bleed's Anarchist Encyclopedia
José Peirats Valls Papers.

1908 births
1989 deaths
People from La Vall d'Uixó
Historians of anarchism
Spanish anarchists
Confederación Nacional del Trabajo members
Spanish newspaper editors
20th-century Spanish historians
Historians of the labour movement in Spain